Lone Tree is an unincorporated community in Greene County, Indiana, in the United States.

History
Lone Tree was likely named for a large oak tree that was a local landmark. The Lone Tree post office closed in 1906.

References

Unincorporated communities in Greene County, Indiana
Unincorporated communities in Indiana